Alfredo Aguilar (born 18 July 1988) is a Paraguayan professional footballer who plays as a goalkeeper for Campeonato Brasileiro Série B club Ceará.

Career

Guaraní
Aguilar has played club football for Guarani.

Olimpia

Ceará
On 2 January 2023, Aguilar signed with Campeonato Brasileiro Série B club Ceará, this is his first experience abroad.

International career
He was called up to the senior Paraguay squad in 2014.

Aguilar was named in Paraguay's provisional squad for Copa América Centenario but was cut from the final squad.

He made his international debut for Paraguay in a 4-2 friendly loss to Japan on 12 June 2018.

Career statistics

Club
.

International

Honours
Guarany
2016 Clausura

Olimpia
Paraguayan Primera División: 2018 Apertura, 2018 Clausura, 2019 Apertura, 2019 Clausura, 2020 Clausura, 2022 Clausura
Supercopa Paraguay: 2021
Copa Paraguay: 2021

References

1988 births
Living people
Paraguayan footballers
Paraguay international footballers
2015 Copa América players
Association football goalkeepers
Club Guaraní players
Club Olimpia footballers
Ceará Sporting Club players
Paraguayan Primera División players
Campeonato Brasileiro Série B players
Paraguayan expatriate footballers
Paraguayan expatriate sportspeople in Brazil
Expatriate footballers in Brazil